Gurgi is a fictional character in The Chronicles of Prydain, the series of fantasy novels by Lloyd Alexander. Gurgi is the hero Taran's faithful companion, appearing in all five books.

Profile 

He is described as being a cross between man and beast, having long arms, covered with fur and leaves, and ever hungry but really "just a sort of a, kind of a thing". His demeanor is extremely loyal and caring, almost to a fault. His manner of speech is filled with rhymed pairs of words ("crunchings and munchings", "smackings and whackings", "sneakings and peekings", etc.), and redundant phrases ("see with lookings!"); he refers to himself in the third person. Gurgi is humble and loyal toward his human companions, at first submitting even to Taran as a "noble lord".

Appearances

Gurgi is one of the few characters to appear in all five books of the series, the others being Taran, Fflewddur, Dallben and Coll.

In The Book of Three, Taran first meets Gurgi in his quest to locate Hen-Wen, the oracular pig. At first, Taran is disdainful of Gurgi, believing him to be more of a nuisance than anything else. By the end of the book, he learns the value of true companionship.

In The Black Cauldron, Gurgi, along with Princess Eilonwy, sneakily follows the Companions to the Black Gate of Annuvin. Gurgi would accompany the Companions to the Marshes of Morva and eventually be the one to find the Black Cauldron.

In The Castle of Llyr, Gurgi accompanies Taran in escorting the Princess Eilonwy to the Isle of Mona and faces all sorts of dangers when she is kidnapped by a foe long thought dead.

In Taran Wanderer, Gurgi loyally follows Taran on what might be the most important quest of his life, the search for his true identity (who his parents were, etc.), and proves to be a true friend.

In The High King, Gurgi's bravery is proven from beginning to end and when all is said and done, he must make the hardest choice of all.

Origins 

According to a 1999 publisher's note, quoting Alexander on The Chronicles, "'The people in it were born, like most children, at unlikely and inconvenient times.. Gurgi, for example, appeared in the predawn hours. ... Suddenly there he was, with his groanings and moanings, looking like a disordered owl's nest."

According to Alexander, nearly all of the proper names in Prydain are from Welsh myth or history, perhaps all except Eilonwy and Taran. There are several characters named Gurgi in Welsh legend, the most important of whom was Peredur's brother.

Disney 

In Disney's animated version of The Black Cauldron, Gurgi is portrayed as a small anthropomorphic dog-like creature. The voice was provided by actor/impressionist John Byner.

There used to be a restaurant in Walt Disney World's Magic Kingdom named after Gurgi, Gurgi's Munchies and Crunchies, which closed in 1993. To this date it has been one of only two vendor/attraction with a Black Cauldron theme at any Disney theme park. The other was an attraction; "Cinderella Castle Mystery Tour" at Tokyo Disneyland, which has also since closed in 2006.

The Disney version of Gurgi also appeared at the Walt Disney Parks and Resorts as a meetable character.

Additional information 

The cover on one edition of The Black Cauldron shows Gurgi looking like a raggedy humanoid with bushy hair and thin limbs, almost like a starving vagrant. Another has him illustrated similar to a Chimpanzee.
Gurgi possesses a magical wallet, a gift from Prince Gwydion, which provides an indefinite supply of nourishing, though somewhat tasteless and dry food.
While his mount has no name per se, he is often seen riding a shaggy pony.

References

Sources 

Fictional humanoids
Literary characters introduced in 1964
The Chronicles of Prydain characters
Fictional illeists